Jin Fo tea (pronounced ) is a  Wuyi Oolong tea,  developed at the Wuyi Shan Tea Researching Center located in Fujian Province, China. It is a medium Wuyi Oolong showing both creaminess and a floral aftertaste. The tea leaves have a uniform emerald green colour.

See also
 List of Chinese teas
 
 

Wuyi tea
Oolong tea
Chinese teas
Chinese tea grown in Fujian